The Maghreb, also known as the Arab Maghreb and Northwest Africa, is the western part of the Arab world. The region comprises western and central North Africa, including Algeria, Libya, Mauritania (also considered part of West Africa), Morocco, and Tunisia. The Maghreb also includes the disputed territory of Western Sahara (controlled mostly by Morocco and partly by the Sahrawi Arab Democratic Republic) and the Spanish cities Ceuta and Melilla. As of 2018, the region had a population of over 100 million people.

Through the 18th and 19th centuries, English sources often referred to the region as the Barbary Coast or the Barbary States, a term derived from the demonym of the Berbers. Sometimes, the region is referred to as the Land of the Atlas, referring to its Atlas Mountains. 

The Maghreb is usually defined as encompassing much of the northern part of Africa, including a large portion of the Sahara Desert, but excluding Egypt and Sudan, which are considered to be located in the Mashriq — the eastern part of the Arab world. The traditional definition of the Maghreb — which restricted its scope to the Atlas Mountains and the coastal plains of Morocco, Algeria, Tunisia and Libya — was expanded in modern times to include Mauritania and the disputed territory of Western Sahara. During the era of Al-Andalus on the Iberian Peninsula (711–1492), the Maghreb's inhabitants —  the Muslim Berbers, or Maghrebi — were known by Europeans as the "Moors". 

Before the establishment of modern nation states in the region during the 20th century, the Maghreb most commonly referred to a smaller area, between the Mediterranean Sea and the Atlas Mountains in the south. It often also included the territory of eastern Libya, but not modern Mauritania. As recently as the late 19th century, the term "Maghreb" was used to refer to the western Mediterranean region of coastal North Africa in general, and to Algeria, Morocco, and Tunisia in particular.

During the rule of the Berber kingdom of Numidia, the region was somewhat unified as an independent political entity. This period was followed by one of the Roman Empire's rule or influence. The Germanic Vandals invaded after that, followed by the equally brief re-establishment of a weak Roman rule by the Byzantine Empire. The Islamic caliphates came to power under the Umayyad Caliphate, the Abbasid Caliphate and the Fatimid Caliphate. The most enduring rule was that of the local Berber empires of the Ifranid dynasty, Almoravid dynasty, Almohad Caliphate, Hammadid dynasty, Zirid dynasty, Marinid dynasty, Zayyanid dynasty, Hafsid dynasty and Wattasid dynasty, extending from the 8th to 13th centuries. The Ottoman Empire also controlled parts of the region for a period.
 	
In the 19th and early 20th centuries, the region was ruled by European powers: France (Algeria, Tunisia, Mauritania and most of Morocco), Spain (northern Morocco and Western Sahara), and Italy (Libya). Italy was expelled from North Africa by the Allies in World War II. Decolonization of the region continued in the decades thereafter, with violent conflicts such as the Algerian War, the Ifni War and the Western Sahara War.  

Algeria, Libya, Mauritania, Morocco, and Tunisia established the Arab Maghreb Union in 1989 to promote cooperation and economic integration in a common market. The union implicitly included Western Sahara under Morocco's membership. However, this progress was short-lived, and the union is now largely dormant. Tensions between Algeria and Morocco over Western Sahara re-emerged, reinforced by the unresolved border dispute between the two countries. These two conflicts have hindered progress on the union's joint goals.

Terminology
The toponym maghrib is a geographical term that the Muslim Arabs gave to the region extending from Alexandria in the east to the Atlantic Ocean in the west. Etymologically it means both the western place/land and the place where the sun sets. It is composed of the prefix ma−, which makes a noun out of the verb root, and غرب (gharaba, to set, as in setting sun) (from gh-r-b root (غ-ر-ب)).

Muslim historians and geographers divided the region into three areas: al-Maghrib al-Adna (the near Maghrib), which included the lands extending from Alexandria to Tarabulus (modern-day Tripoli) in the west; al-Maghrib al-Awsat (the middle Maghrib), which extended from Tripoli to Bijaya (Béjaïa); and al-Maghrib al-Aqsa (the far Maghrib), which extended from Tahart (Tiaret) to the Atlantic Ocean. They disagreed, however, over the definition of the eastern boundary. Some authors place it at the sea of Kulzum (the Red Sea) and thus include Egypt and the country of Barca in the Maghrib. Ibn Khaldun does not accept this definition because, he says, the inhabitants of the Maghreb do not consider Egypt and Barca as forming part of Maghrib. The latter commences only at the province of Tripoli and includes the districts of which the country of the Berbers was composed in former times. Later Maghribi writers repeated the definition of Ibn Khaldun, with a few variations in details.

 the term Maghrib is still used in opposition to Mashriq in a sense near to that which it had in medieval times, but it also denotes simply Morocco when the full al-Maghrib al-Aksa is abbreviated. Certain politicians seek a political union of the North African countries, which they call al-Maghrib al-Kabir (the grand Maghrib) or al-Maghrib al-Arabi (the Arab Maghrib). 

Speakers of Berber languages call this region Tamazɣa or Tamazgha, which translates to "land of the Berbers". Since the second half of the twentieth century, this term has been popularized by activists promoting Berberism.

History

Prehistory

Around 3,500 BC, changes in the tilt of the Earth's orbit appear to have caused a rapid desertification of the Sahara region forming a natural barrier that severely limited contact between the Maghreb and sub-Saharan Africa. The Berber people have inhabited western North Africa since at least 10,000 BC.

Antiquity

Partially isolated from the rest of the continent by the Atlas Mountains (stretching from present-day Morocco to present-day Tunisia) and by the Sahara desert, inhabitants of the northern parts of the Berber world have long had commercial and cultural ties across the Mediterranean Sea to the inhabitants of the regions of Southern Europe and Western Asia. These trade relations date back at least to the Phoenicians in the 1st millennium BC. (According to tradition, the Phoenicians founded their colony of Carthage  (in present-day Tunisia) ).

Phoenicians and Carthaginians arrived for trade. The main Berber and Phoenician settlements centered in the Gulf of Tunis (Carthage, Utica, Tunisia) along the North African littoral, between the Pillars of Hercules and the Libyan coast east of ancient Cyrenaica. They dominated the trade and intercourse of the Western Mediterranean for centuries.  Rome's defeat of Carthage in the Punic Wars (264 to 146 BC) enabled Rome to establish the Province of Africa (146 BC) and to control many of these ports. Rome eventually took control of the entire Maghreb north of the Atlas Mountains. Rome was greatly helped by the defection of Massinissa (later King of Numidia) and of Carthage's eastern Numidian Massylii client-allies. Some of the most mountainous regions, such as the Moroccan Rif, remained outside  Roman control. Furthermore, during the rule of the Romans, Byzantines, Vandals and Carthaginians the Kabyle people were the only or one of the few in North Africa who remained independent. The Kabyle people were incredibly resistible so much so that even during the Arab conquest of North Africa they still had control and possession over their mountains.

The pressure put on the Western Roman Empire by the Barbarian invasions (notably by the Vandals and  Visigoths in Iberia) in the 5th century AD reduced Roman control and led to the establishment of the Vandal Kingdom of North Africa in 430 A.D., with its capital at Carthage. A century later, the  Byzantine emperor Justinian I sent (533) a force under General Belisarius that  succeeded in destroying the Vandal Kingdom in 534.  Byzantine rule lasted for 150 years. The Berbers contested the extent of Byzantine control.

After the advent of Islam in Mediterranean Africa in the period from 639 to 700 AD, Arabs took control of the entire Maghreb region.

Middle Ages

The Arabs reached the Maghreb in early Umayyad times. Islamic Berber kingdoms such as the Almohads expansion and the spread of Islam contributed to the development of trans-Saharan trade. While restricted due to the cost and dangers, the trade was highly profitable. Commodities traded included such goods as salt, gold, ivory, and slaves. Arab control over the Maghreb was quite weak. Various Islamic variations, such as the Ibadis and the Shia, were adopted by some Berbers, often leading to scorning of Caliphal control in favour of their own interpretation of Islam.

As a result of the invasion of the Banu Hilal Arabs, the Arabic language and dialects spread slowly without eliminating Berber. These Arabs had been set upon the Berbers by the Fatimids in punishment for their Zirid former Berber clients who defected and abandoned Shiism in the 12th century. Throughout this period, the Berber world most often was divided into three states, roughly corresponding to modern Morocco, western Algeria, and eastern Algeria and Tunisia. The Maghreb region was occasionally briefly unified, as under the Almohad Berber empire, Fatimids and briefly under the Zirids. The Hammadids also managed to conquer land in all countries in the Maghreb region.

Early modern history

Modern history

After the 19th century, areas of the Maghreb were colonized by France, Spain and later Italy.

Today, more than two and a half million Maghrebi immigrants live in France, many from Algeria and Morocco. In addition, as of 1999 there were 3 million French of Maghrebi origin (defined as having at least one grandparent from Algeria, Morocco or Tunisia). A 2003 estimate suggests six million French residents were ethnic Maghrebi.

Population

Ethnic groups 
The Maghreb is primarily inhabited by peoples of Arab and Berber ancestral origin. Arabs inhabit Algeria (70% to 80%), Libya (97%), Morocco (67%), and Tunisia (98%). Berbers inhabit Algeria (20%), Libya (10%), Morocco (35%), and Tunisia (1%). Ethnic French, Spanish, West African, and Sephardic Jewish populations also inhabit the region.

Various other influences are also prominent throughout the Maghreb. In northern coastal towns, in particular, several waves of European immigrants influenced the population in the Medieval era. Most notable were the moriscos and muladies, that is, the indigenous Spaniards (Moors) who were forcibly converted to Catholicism and later expelled, together with ethnic Arab and Berber Muslims, during the Spanish Catholic Reconquista. Other European contributions included French, Italian, and English crews and passengers taken captive by corsairs. In some cases, they were returned to families after being ransomed; in others, they were used as slaves or assimilated and adopted into tribes.

Historically, the Maghreb was home to significant historic Jewish communities called Maghrebim, who predated the 7th-century introduction and conversion of the region to Islam. These were later augmented by Sephardic Jews from Spain and Portugal who, fleeing the Spanish Catholic Inquisition of the 15th and 16th centuries, established a presence in North Africa. They settled primarily in the urban trading centers. 

Another significant group is Turks, who migrated with the expansion of the Ottoman Empire. 

Africans from south of the Sahara joined the population mix during centuries of trans-Saharan trade. Traders and slaves went to the Maghreb from the Sahel region. On the Saharan southern edge of the Maghreb are small communities of black populations, sometimes called Haratine. 

In Algeria especially, a large European minority, known as the "pied noirs", immigrated to the region, settling under French colonial rule in the late 19th century. They established farms and businesses. The overwhelming majority of these, however, left Algeria during and following the war for independence.

In comparison to the population of France, the Maghrebi population was one-eighth of France's population in 1800, one-quarter in 1900, and equal in 2000. The Maghreb is home to 1% of the global population as of 2010.

Genetics 

The Y-chromosome genetic structure of the Maghreb population seems to be modulated chiefly by geography. The Y-DNA Haplogroups E1b1b and J make up the vast majority of the genetic markers of the populations of the Maghreb. Haplogroup E1b1b is the most widespread among Maghrebi groups, especially the downstream lineage of E1b1b1b1a, which is typical of the indigenous Berbers of North-West Africa. Haplogroup J is more indicative of Middle East origins, and has its highest distribution among populations in Arabia and the Levant. Due to the distribution of E-M81(E1b1b1b1a), which has reached its highest documented levels in the world at 95–100% in some populations of the Maghreb, it has often been termed the "Berber marker" in the scientific literature. The second most common marker, Haplogroup J, especially J1, which is typically Middle Eastern and originates in the Arabian peninsula, can reach frequencies of up to 35% in the region. Its highest density is found in the Arabian Peninsula. Haplogroup R1, a Eurasian marker, has also been observed in the Maghreb, though with lower frequency. The Y-DNA haplogroups shown above are observed in both Arabic speakers and Berber-speakers.

The Maghreb Y chromosome pool (including both Arab and Berber populations) may be summarized for most of the populations as follows, where only two haplogroups E1b1b and J comprise generally more than 80% of the total chromosomes:

Religion

The original religions of the peoples of the Maghreb seem to have been based in and related to fertility cults of a strong matriarchal pantheon. This theory is based on the social and linguistic structures of the Amazigh cultures that antedated all Egyptian and eastern Asian, northern Mediterranean, and European influences.

Historic records of religion in the Maghreb region show its gradual inclusion in the Classical World, with coastal colonies established first by Phoenicians, some Greeks, and later extensive conquest and colonization by the Romans. By the 2nd century of the common era, the area had become a center of Phoenician-speaking Christianity. Its bishops spoke and wrote in Punic, and Emperor Septimius Severus was noted by his local accent. Roman settlers and Romanized populations converted to Christianity. The region produced figures such as Christian church writer Tertullian (c. 155 – c. 202); and Christian martyrs or leading figures such as Perpetua, and Felicity (martyrs, c. 200 CE); St. Cyprian of Carthage (+ 258); St. Monica; her son the philosopher St. Augustine, Bishop of Hippo I (+ 430) (1); and St. Julia of Carthage (5th century).

Islam
Islam arrived in 647 and challenged the domination of Christianity. The first permanent foothold of Islam was the founding in 667 of the city of Kairouan, in present-day Tunisia. Carthage fell to Muslims in 698 and the remainder of the region fell by 709. Islamization proceeded slowly. 

From the end of the 7th century, over a period of more than 400 years, the region's peoples converted to Islam. Many left during this time for Italy, although surviving letters showed correspondence from regional Christians to Rome up until the 12th century. Christianity was still a living faith. Although there were numerous conversions after the conquest, Muslims did not become a majority until some time late in the 9th century. During the 10th century, Islam became by far the dominant religion in the region. Christian bishoprics and dioceses continued to be active and continued their relations with the Christian Church of Rome. As late as the reign of Pope Benedict VII (974–983), a new Archbishop of Carthage was consecrated. From the 10th century, Christianity declined in the region. By the end of the 11th century, only two bishops were left in Carthage and Hippo Regius. Pope Gregory VII (1073–85) consecrated a new bishop for Hippo. Christianity seems to have suffered several shocks that led to its demise. First, many upper-class, urban-dwelling, Latin-speaking Christians left for Europe after the Muslim conquest. The second major influence was the large-scale conversions to Islam from the end of the 9th century. Many Christians of a much reduced community departed in the mid-11th century, and remnants were evacuated in the 12th by the Norman rulers of Sicily. The Latin-African language lingered a while longer.

There was a small but thriving Jewish community, as well as a small Christian community. Most Muslims follow the Sunni Maliki school. Small Ibadi communities remain in some areas. A strong tradition of venerating marabouts and saints' tombs is found throughout regions inhabited by Berbers. This practice was also common among the Jews of the region. Any map of the region demonstrates the tradition by the proliferation of "Sidi"s, showing places named after the marabouts. This tradition has declined through the 20th century. A network of zaouias traditionally helped teach basic literacy and knowledge of Islam in rural regions.

Christianity

Communities of Christians, mostly Catholics and Protestant, persist in Algeria (100,000–380,000), Mauritania (10,000), Morocco (~380,000), Libya (170,000), and Tunisia (100,750). Most of the Roman Catholics in Greater Maghreb are of French, Spanish, and Italian descent, with ancestors who immigrated during the colonial era. Some are foreign missionaries or immigrant workers. There are also Christian communities of Berber or Arab descent in Greater Maghreb, made up of persons who converted mostly during the modern era, or under and after French colonialism. Prior to independence, Algeria was home to 1.4 million pieds-noirs (ethnic French who were mostly Catholic), and Morocco was home to half a million Europeans, Tunisia was home to 255,000 Europeans, and Libya was home to 145,000 Europeans. In religion, most of the pieds-noirs in Maghreb are Catholic. Due to the exodus of the pieds-noirs in the 1960s, more North African Christians of Berber or Arab descent now live in France than in Greater Maghreb.

Recently, the Protestant community of Berber or Arab descent has grown significantly as additional individuals convert to Christianity, especially to Evangelicalism. This has occurred in Algeria, especially in the Kabylie, Morocco and in Tunisia. 

A 2015 study estimates 380,000 Muslims converted to Christianity in Algeria. The number of Moroccans who converted to Christianity (most of them secret worshipers) are estimated between 40,000-150,000. The International Religious Freedom Report for 2007 estimates thousands of Tunisian Muslims have converted to Christianity. A 2015 study estimate some 1,500 believers in Christ from a Muslim background living in Libya.

Maghrebi traders in Jewish history
In the 10th century, as the social and political environment in Baghdad became increasingly hostile to Jews, some Jewish traders emigrated to the Maghreb, especially Kairouan, Tunisia. Over the following two or three centuries, such Jewish traders became known as the Maghribi, a distinctive social group who traveled throughout the Mediterranean world. They passed this identification on from father to son. Their tight-knit pan-Maghreb community had the ability to use social sanctions as a credible alternative to legal recourse, which was weak at the time anyway. This unique institutional alternative permitted the Maghribis to very successfully participate in the Mediterranean trade.

Geography

Ecoregions
The Maghreb is divided into a Mediterranean climate region in the north, and the arid Sahara in the south. The Maghreb's variations in elevation, rainfall, temperature, and soils give rise to distinct communities of plants and animals. The World Wide Fund for Nature (WWF) identifies several distinct ecoregions in the Maghreb.

Mediterranean Maghreb

The portions of the Maghreb between the Atlas Mountains and the Mediterranean Sea, along with coastal Tripolitania and Cyrenaica in Libya, are home to Mediterranean forests, woodlands, and scrub. These ecoregions share many species of plants and animals with other portions of Mediterranean Basin. The southern extent of the Mediterranean Maghreb corresponds with the  isohyet, or the southern range of the European Olive (Olea europea) and Esparto Grass (Stipa tenacissima).
 Mediterranean acacia-argania dry woodlands and succulent thickets (Morocco, Canary Islands (Spain), Western Sahara)
 Mediterranean dry woodlands and steppe (Algeria, Egypt, Libya, Morocco, Tunisia)
 Mediterranean woodlands and forests (Algeria, Libya, Morocco, Tunisia)
 Mediterranean conifer and mixed forests (Algeria, Morocco, Tunisia, Spain)
 Mediterranean High Atlas juniper steppe (Morocco)

Saharan Maghreb
The Sahara extends across northern Africa from the Atlantic Ocean to the Red Sea. Its central part is hyper-arid and supports little plant or animal life, but the northern portion of the desert receives occasional winter rains, while the strip along the Atlantic coast receives moisture from marine fog, which nourishes a greater variety of plants and animals. The northern edge of the Sahara corresponds to the 100 mm isohyet, which is also the northern range of the date palm (Phoenix dactylifera).
 North Saharan steppe and woodlands: This ecoregion lies along the northern edge of the Sahara, next to the Mediterranean forests, woodlands, and scrub ecoregions of the Mediterranean Maghreb and Cyrenaica. Winter rains sustain shrublands and dry woodlands that form a transition between the Mediterranean climate regions to the north and the hyper-arid Sahara proper to the south. It covers 1,675,300 square km (646,800 square miles) in Algeria, Egypt, Libya, Mauritania, Morocco, Tunisia, and Western Sahara.
 Atlantic coastal desert: The Atlantic coastal desert occupies a narrow strip along the Atlantic coast, where fog generated offshore by the cool Canary Current provides sufficient moisture to sustain a variety of lichens, succulents, and shrubs.
 Sahara desert: This ecoregion covers the hyper-arid central portion of the Sahara where rainfall is minimal and sporadic. Vegetation is rare, and this ecoregion consists mostly of sand dunes (erg), stone plateaus (hamada), gravel plains (reg), dry valleys (wadi), and salt flats. It covers 4,639,900 square km (1,791,500 square miles) of Algeria, Chad, Egypt, Libya, Mali, Mauritania, Niger, and Sudan.
 Saharan halophytics: Seasonally flooded saline depressions in the Maghreb are home to halophytic, or salt-adapted, plant communities. The Saharan halophytics cover 54,000 square km (20,800 square miles), including Tunisian salt lakes of central Tunisia, Chott Melghir in Algeria, and other areas of Egypt, Algeria, Mauritania, and Western Sahara.

Culture

  

The countries of the Maghreb share many cultural traditions. Among these is a culinary tradition that Habib Bourguiba defined as Western Arab, where bread or couscous are the staple foods, as opposed to Eastern Arab, where bread, crushed wheat or white rice are the staple foods. In terms of food, some similarities beyond the starches are found throughout the Arab world.

Among other cultural and artistic traditions, jewellery of the Berber cultures worn by Amazigh women and made of silver, beads and other applications was a common trait of Berber identities in large areas of the Maghreb up to the second half of the 20th century.

Economy

Maghreb countries by GDP (PPP)

Medieval regions
 Ifriqiya (currently Tunisia, Constantinois and Tripolitania)
 Djerid
 Sous
 M'zab
 Draa Valley
 Hodna
 Rif
 Tamesna 
 Tripolitania 
 Maghreb al-Awsat (Central Maghreb – currently Northern Algeria)
 Maghreb al-Aqsa (Western Maghreb – currently Morocco)
 Maghreb al-Adna (Eastern Maghreb – currently Libya and Tunisia)

See also

 Arab Maghreb Union
 Barbary Coast
 Berber people
 History of Algeria
 History of Libya
 History of Mauritania
 History of Morocco
 History of Tunisia
 History of Western Sahara
 Maghreb French
 Maghreb toponymy
 Maghrebi script
 Maghrebi Arabs
 Maghrebi Jews
 Mashriq, "place of sunrise", which contrasts Maghreb, "place of sunset"
 Miloud
 Moors
 Occident
 Mughrabi (disambiguation)
 Plazas de soberanía
 Tamazgha
 Sahel
 Juliette Bessis, Maghreb scholar

Notes and references

External links

 Politics, economics, and human affairs analysis in the Maghhreb
 Maghreb Radio Stations
 News and Views of the Maghreb
 Peacekeeping mission in Maghreb: The MINURSO
 Total population of the MENA countries 2018

 
Geography of North Africa
Regions of Africa